Mark Stewart Bennett (born 3 February 1993) is a Scottish rugby union footballer who plays as a centre for Edinburgh Rugby in the United Rugby Championship.

Rugby union career

Amateur career

Bennett started his career playing for Cumnock before moving to Ayr RFC and winning the Scottish Premiership in 2011.

Professional career

He also made his senior debut for Glasgow in 2011 and secured a move to French side ASM Clermont Auvergne.   A serious knee injury disrupted his season, and he returned to Glasgow in 2012 to join the Warriors on loan with the move being made permanent in 2013.

On 14 February 2017, Edinburgh Rugby announced that they had signed him on a three-year deal and that he would begin playing for them from the summer.

International career

Bennett has represented Scotland at Under 18 level four times and played 21 times at under-20 level including appearances at the 2011, 2012 and 2013 IRB Junior World Championships.

Bennett was named in Vern Cotter's first ever squad for Scotland's 2014 summer tour, but failed to play in any of the four games. He was reselected in Scotland's squad for the 2014 Autumn Internationals, making his debut in Scotland's 41–31 victory over Argentina on 8 November 2014.

After establishing himself in the squad, Bennett played in all five of Scotland's matches in the 2015 Six Nations Championship, notching tries against Italy and England. He also had a potentially decisive try against Wales controversially disallowed, after team-mate Sam Hidalgo-Clyne was judged to have knocked-on when fouled near the try line.

After recovering from an injury which ruled him out of the run-in to Glasgow Warriors' 2014–15 Pro12 title triumph, Bennett was selected in Scotland's 31-man squad for the 2015 Rugby World Cup. He scored two tries in the team's opening match victory over Japan. Bennett was nominated for "Breakthrough Player of the Year" by World Rugby after the tournament. During the 2022 Six Nations Championship, Bennet was called up to the international squad and made his international return as a replacement in the loss to France at BT Murrayfield.

He represented Great Britain at the 2016 Summer Olympics where the team won silver after losing the gold medal match to Fiji.

International tries

References

External links
 
 
 

1993 births
Living people
ASM Clermont Auvergne players
Ayr RFC players
Cumnock RFC players
Edinburgh Rugby players
Expatriate rugby union players in France
Glasgow Warriors players
Great Britain national rugby sevens team players
Male rugby sevens players
Medalists at the 2016 Summer Olympics
Olympic medalists in rugby sevens
Olympic rugby sevens players of Great Britain
Olympic silver medallists for Great Britain
People from Cumnock
Rugby sevens players at the 2016 Summer Olympics
Rugby union centres
Rugby union players from Irvine, North Ayrshire
Scotland international rugby sevens players
Scotland international rugby union players
Scottish expatriate rugby union players
Scottish expatriate sportspeople in France
Scottish Olympic medallists
Scottish rugby union players